The Book of the Still is a BBC Books original novel written by Paul Ebbs and based on the long-running British science fiction television series Doctor Who. It features the Eighth Doctor, Fitz and Anji.

External links
The Cloister Library - The Book of the Still

2002 British novels
2002 science fiction novels
Eighth Doctor Adventures